Newtonmore railway station serves the village of Newtonmore, Highland, Scotland. The station is managed by ScotRail and is on the Highland Main Line. It is currently the only station on the Highland Main Line to have one platform, although the former second platform can still be seen adjacent to the first platform.

History

The station had two platforms, connected with a footbridge, either side of a passing loop, there was a goods yard to the north that was able to accommodate most types of goods including live stock, it was equipped with a five-ton crane. There were two signal boxes and a turntable.

A camping coach was positioned here by the Scottish Region from 1964 to 1967.

The station was listed for closure in the 1980s but was saved.

Accidents and incidents 
The original station buildings were constructed of wood and were destroyed in a fire in April 1893. A replacement station building in stone was erected in 1893.

A serious accident occurred on 2 August 1894 when the morning passenger train from Perth to Inverness collided with a goods train. One passenger was killed and several were badly injured.

On 13 September 1900, James Ormiston, a brakesman was killed in a shunting accident at the station.

Facilities 
The station has very basic facilities, including a modern waiting shelter, a help point, a small car park and bike racks. As there are no facilities to purchase tickets, passengers must buy one in advance, or from the guard on the train.

Passenger volume 

The statistics cover twelve month periods that start in April.

Services

In the May 2022 timetable, on weekdays and Saturdays, the station is served by 4 trains per day northbound to Inverness, and 4 southbound to Glasgow Queen Street and 1 to Edinburgh. On Sundays, it is served by 3 trains northbound to Inverness (including 1 extended to Elgin), and 1 train to Glasgow Queen Street and Edinburgh each, as well as a southbound LNER train service to London King's Cross.

References

External Links 

 Video footage of the station on YouTube

Railway stations in Highland (council area)
Former Highland Railway stations
Railway stations in Great Britain opened in 1863
Railway stations served by ScotRail
Railway stations served by Caledonian Sleeper
Railway stations served by London North Eastern Railway
William Roberts railway stations
Listed railway stations in Scotland
Category B listed buildings in Highland (council area)